Reef Hills State Park is a protected area of 2013 hectares, about 5 km south-west of Benalla, in the north east of Victoria, Australia.  There are traces of a mining activity from the gold rush. It was established in 1986.

Environment
The park is home to more than 17 mammal species and 100 bird species.  It is part of the Warby-Chiltern Box-Ironbark Region Important Bird Area, identified as such by BirdLife International because of its importance for the conservation of Box-Ironbark forest ecosystems and several species of threatened woodland birds dependent on them.

References

State parks of Victoria (Australia)
Protected areas established in 1986
1986 establishments in Australia
Box-ironbark forest
Parks of Hume (region)